Christopher Aoun (born 15 December 1989) is a Lebanese-German cinematographer, best known for his work in CAPERNAUM, a Cannes Grand Prix du Jury winner and Oscar nominee film, The Man Who Sold His Skin, and Copilot. Aoun is also a member of the Academy of Motion Picture Arts and Science.

Early life and education
Aoun was born on 15 December 1989 in Beirut. He later studied cinematography at the Université Saint-Joseph de Beyrouth and the University of Television and Film Munich.

Career
Aoun prior to shooting 'Capernaum,' worked on Philippe Aractingi's film 'Listen' in Lebanon, the documentary 'Kalveli - Shadows of the Desert' in India, and several other advertisements and music videos globally. He gained public recognition for his work in Nadine Labaki's Academy Award-nominated film 'Capernaum,' which also received the Jury Prize at the 2018 Cannes Film Festival.

Aoun won the German Cinematography Award in 2019 and was selected by Variety as one of the "10 Cinematographers to Watch," as well as a "Rising Star of Cinematography" by American Cinematographer magazine.
 He also became a member of the Academy of Motion Picture Arts and Sciences in the same year.

Aoun's also garnered much attention in 2021 for his work in Copilot, directed by Anne Zohra Berrached, which was premiered at the Berlinale Film Festival, and Kaouther Ben Hania's 'The Man who Sold his Skin', starring Monica Bellucci, which was nominated for the Academy Awards.

Filmography

Awards and recognition
 2017- The Lebanese Movie Award for Ismail
 2017- Milano International Film Festival Award and Best International Short Film
 2019- German Camera Award for Capharnaüm 
 2019- The Lebanese Movie Award, Best Cinematography In A Lebanese Motion Picture for Capharnaüm
 2021- German Camera Award for The Man Who Sold His Skin

Personal life
Aoun is fluent in French, Arabic, German, and English.

References

Lebanese cinematographers
German cinematographers
1989 births
Living people